Related	British suffragists in the early twentieth century

 Sarah Ellen (Nell) Kenney Clarke (1876–1953)   - sister
 Ann (Annie) Kenney (1879–1953)                - sister
 Caroline (Kitty) Kenney (1880–1952)          - sister
 Jane (Jenny) Kenney (1884–1961)        - sister
 Jessica (Jessie) Kenney (1887–1985)          - sister

References

Women's Social and Political Union
Feminism and history